The 1889 Belfast North by-election was a parliamentary by-election held for the United Kingdom House of Commons constituency of Belfast North on 12 August 1889. The vacancy arose because of the death of the sitting member, Sir William Ewart of the Conservative party. Only one candidate was nominated, the shipbuilder Edward James Harland, also a Conservative, who was elected unopposed.

External links 
A Vision Of Britain Through Time

References

1889 elections in the United Kingdom
19th century in Belfast
August 1889 events
North
Unopposed by-elections to the Parliament of the United Kingdom in Irish constituencies
1889 elections in Ireland